The 7th Infantry Division, Philippine Army, known officially as the Kaugnáy Division, is the Philippine Army's primary infantry unit specializing in rapid deployment.

History
The division was originally established on August 1, 1988. During the Communist Insurgency of the Philippines, the local government soldiers and officers under the division were responsible for sending combat operations into:
 Central Luzon, designated as Region III
 Aurora
 Bataan
 Bulacan
 Nueva Ecija
 Pampanga
 Tarlac
 Zambales

These Anti-Communist Operations supported the Armed Forces of the Philippines, Philippine National Police, and the CAFGU militia forces. Their primary opponents were the Communist Party of the Philippines-New People's Army (CPP-NPA), and other local criminal elements.

Its headquarters are currently located at Fort Ramon Magsaysay in Nueva Ecija.

Mission
Their mission is to conduct sustained Internal Security Operations (ISO) in Region III to neutralize the armed wing of the Communist Party of the Philippines (CPP) and the New Peoples Army (NPA). They aim to create a physically and psychologically sound environment conducive for development and commerce.

Current units
The following are the Brigade units that are under the 7th Infantry Division.
 703rd Infantry Brigade
 702nd Infantry Brigade
 1st Brigade Combat Team (Philippines)

The following are the Battalion units that are under the 7th ID.
 24th Infantry Battalion
 48th Infantry Battalion
 3rd Infantry Battalion
 56th Infantry Battalion
 70th Infantry Battalion (Cadre)
 71st Infantry Battalion
 81st Infantry (Spartan) Battalion
 84th Infantry (Victorious) Battalion
 3rd Mechanized Infantry Battalion
 71st Division Reconnaissance Company
 72nd Division Reconnaissance Company
 73rd Division Reconnaissance Company

Operations
 Internal Security Operations

References

 Official Site of the PA 7ID.

Infantry divisions of the Philippines
Military units and formations established in 1988